Takahiro Sasaki may refer to:

Takahiro Sasaki (footballer), Japanese footballer
Takahiro Sasaki (politician), Japanese politician